Statistics of Qatar Stars League for the 1996–97 season.

Overview
It was contested by 9 teams, and Al-Arabi Sports Club won the championship.

League standings

References
Qatar - List of final tables (RSSSF)

1996–97 in Asian association football leagues
1996–97 in Qatari football